= European Championship in football =

European championships in football may refer to:

- UEFA Champions League (clubs)
- UEFA Europa League (clubs)
- UEFA Conference League (clubs)
- UEFA European Championship
- UEFA European Under-21 Championship
- UEFA European Under-19 Championship
- UEFA European Under-17 Championship
